James Hamilton Howe (November 14, 1856 in Boxford, Massachusetts – April 12, 1934 in Seattle, Washington) was a pianist and the first Dean of the Music School at DePauw University in Greencastle, Indiana when it was founded in 1884.

Education
James Hamilton Howe graduated from the College of Music of Boston University.

Depauw University
During the first year of his term, Howe gave two lecture-recitals on the “History of Pianoforte Technique” and “My System of Pianoforte Technique,” and gave the first recital the School of Music offered.  Professors of Piano Glen Sherman, Claude Cymerman, and Lorna Griffitt repeated that exact program as a part of the School of Music's centennial celebration in 1984.  Over the next 10 years, Howe established a curriculum, overcome strong opposition to an opera program, and encourage an active performance calendar.

Alpha Chi Omega
While he was Dean of the Music School, Howe was also instrumental in the founding of Alpha Chi Omega fraternity.  Howe gathered together seven young women from the school to attend a meeting for the purpose of forming a society. The first appearance of the seven founders – Anna Allen Smith, Olive Burnett Clark, Bertha Deniston Cunningham, Amy DuBois Rieth, Nellie Gamble Childe, Bessie Grooms Keenan, and Estelle Leonard – was in Meharry Hall of East College, wearing scarlet and olive ribbon streamers attached to their dresses.

References

1856 births
1934 deaths
American conductors (music)
American male conductors (music)
American pianists
Boston University College of Fine Arts alumni
DePauw University faculty
American male pianists